Roger Stott,  (7 August 1943 – 9 August 1999) was a British Labour Party politician.

Biography
Stott was born in Rochdale, the first child of Richard and Edith Stott. He was of Scottish  descent. He went to school in Rochdale and when he was 15 he joined the Merchant Navy. He then worked as an engineer for the Post Office and became local councillor for the Labour Party in Rochdale, where he was the Chair of the Housing Committee. He married Irene Mills on 17 June 1969 from which he had two sons Andrew (1970) and Joe (Stott) Mills (1972). The marriage ended in 1982 and he married again for a second time to a teacher Gillian Pye on 30 March 1985 and later had two children Daniel and Ciara. When Stott was not working, he loved to play sport, he was a great rugby league fan and went to watch it whenever he had the chance. He was also a great fan of cricket.

Political career
Stott represented the North West Region on the National Committee of the Labour Party Young Socialists in 1969, following Peter Kent. He contested Cheadle in 1970, coming third.

Stott was first elected to the House of Commons as Member of Parliament (MP) for Westhoughton at a by-election in 1973, following the death of the sitting Labour MP Tom Price. He was sponsored by the Post Office Engineering Union (POEU). He held that seat at three subsequent general elections before the constituency was abolished for the 1983 general election.

He was then elected MP for the Wigan constituency in Greater Manchester, and held that seat at the next three general elections.  His death in office in 1999 made him the fourth Wigan MP in the twentieth century to die in office (the others being John Parkinson, Ronald Williams and William Foster).

Stott was a longtime joint chairman of the Council for the Advancement of Arab-British Understanding, and served as Parliamentary Private Secretary to James Callaghan during his administration.  He later served as a junior opposition spokesman.

Death
Stott died of liver cancer on Monday, 9 August 1999, two days after his 56th birthday. He had been ill for some time. After his death many people, including Ian McCartney and Jack Cunningham, wrote tributes to him and the work he had done while he was MP.

External links 
 

1943 births
1999 deaths
British Merchant Navy personnel
Councillors in Lancashire
Labour Party (UK) councillors
Labour Party (UK) MPs for English constituencies
Commanders of the Order of the British Empire
English people of Scottish descent
Deaths from liver cancer
Deaths from cancer in the United Kingdom
People from Rochdale
Parliamentary Private Secretaries to the Prime Minister
Members of the Parliament of the United Kingdom for Wigan
Post Office Engineering Union-sponsored MPs
UK MPs 1970–1974
UK MPs 1974
UK MPs 1974–1979
UK MPs 1979–1983
UK MPs 1983–1987
UK MPs 1987–1992
UK MPs 1992–1997
UK MPs 1997–2001